Magouliana is a mountain village and a community in the municipal unit of Vytina, Arcadia, Greece. In 2011, it had a population of 117 for the village and 119 for the community, which includes the small village Pan. It sits at 1,365 m above sea level, under the ruined Argyrokastro Castle. Magouliana is 3 km southwest of Lasta, 5 km west of Vytina and 12 km northeast of Dimitsana. It is considered a traditional settlement.

Population

Geography and history
According to several sources, the village was founded between 1530 and 1600 by inhabitants of five settlements, Agios Athanasios (Kastro), Agios Konstantinos (Leivadi), Agios Ioannis (Kampeas), Petrovouni and Megisti or Katsipodas, fleeing from raiding Lalaioi Turks. According to Max Vasmer, the name might derive from the Slavic word Mogyljane ("hill people"). The word is also related to the modern Greek μαγούλα (magoula, of Slavic or Albanian origin) which means hill or small mound. It was renamed to Argyrokastro in 1927, but it was renamed back to Magouliana in 1929.

People
Fotios Chrysanthopoulos (Fotakos), first councillor for Theodoros Kolokotronis
Ilias Mariolopoulos, nature meteorologist at the University of Athens
Konstantinos Gontikas, politician, minister
Dimitrios Gontikas, politician, president of the parliament
Andrew Jarvis, Greek-American politician
Georgios Kanellopoulos, Supreme Court magistrate

See also
List of settlements in Arcadia
List of traditional settlements of Greece

References

External links
The weather in Magouliana
Magouliana at the GTP Travel Pages

Populated places in Arcadia, Peloponnese
Vytina